Ellingson is a ghost town in Perkins County, South Dakota, United States.

History
A post office called Ellingson was established in 1908, and remained in operation until April, 1954. Andrew C. Ellingson, an early postmaster, gave the town his name.

References

Ghost towns in South Dakota
Geography of Perkins County, South Dakota